Spangles may refer to:

 Spangles (sweets), a brand of boiled sweets manufactured by Mars Ltd in the United Kingdom
 Spangles (1926 film), a 1926 silent film drama
 Spangles (1928 film), a 1928 British silent drama film
 Spangles (restaurant), a family-owned fast food chain based in Wichita, Kansas
 Spangles Muldoon (1946–2008), British radio broadcaster

See also 
 Spangle (disambiguation)